Duncan Renaldo (1904–1980) was an American actor of European birth. He was best known in the 1950s United States for his lead role in The Cisco Kid, which co-starred Leo Carrillo as Pancho. The children's television series ran for six years and 156 episodes 1950–1956. He and Carrillo first crossed professional paths in the 1935 film Moonlight Murder. Prior to his television success, Renaldo appeared in 67 feature-length films beginning in the silent era. Metro-Goldwyn-Mayer hired him in 1929 for a silent version of The Bridge of San Luis Rey. Paramount Pictures cast him in five films, including the acclaimed Two Years Before the Mast and For Whom the Bell Tolls.

Twenty of his films were for Republic Pictures, appearing alongside Republic lead stars John Wayne, Gene Autry, Roy Rogers and Bob Steele. When Ray Corrigan left the popular Three Mesquiteers series of western films in 1939, rather than immediately casting another actor in his recurring role of Tucson Smith, Republic created the role of Rico for Renaldo who portrayed the character in seven subsequent Mesquiteer films.

Although Renaldo was seen by audiences most often as Spanish surnamed characters, the Romania-born actor never knew his own parents or his ethnic heritage.  His film career took a two-year hiatus at McNeil Island Federal Prison for falsifying passport documents by claiming his birthplace as New Jersey. When President Franklin D. Roosevelt granted him a pardon in 1936, he was able to resume his career and was granted full American citizenship by Judge James O'Connor in 1941.

In 1945, he appeared in three Monogram Pictures films as the Cisco Kid, paired with Martin Garralaga as Cisco's sidekick Pancho. Preceding the successful television series, he and Leo Carrillo teamed up in 1949 and 1950 for five feature length Cisco Kid movies for United Artists, four of which he co-produced. For his contributions to the entertainment industry, Renaldo received a star at 1680 Vine Street on the Hollywood Walk of Fame on February 8, 1960. Dunan Renaldo also appeared in the Republic Pictures 1937 serial Zorro Rides Again, as Zorro's confidant Renaldo.

Films

See also
Leo Carrillo on stage and screen

Citations

References

External links

Male actor filmographies
American filmographies